This is a list of songs co-written and produced by American singer, songwriter, and producer Ester Dean.

References

Dean, Ester